Annabelle Kovacs (born 20 April 1996) is a Canadian rhythmic gymnast.

Career 
She competed with the Canadian team (Patricia Bezzoubenko, Maria Kitkarska) at the 2014 Pacific Rim Championships where they won the Team silver medal. Kovacs was a member of the Canadian team that won a gold medal in the team event (with teammates Patricia Bezzoubenko and Maria Kitkarska) at the 2014 Commonwealth Games in Glasgow.

References

1996 births
Living people
Canadian people of Sámi descent
Commonwealth Games gold medallists for Canada
Commonwealth Games medallists in gymnastics
Canadian rhythmic gymnasts
Gymnasts at the 2014 Commonwealth Games
Sportspeople from Vancouver
21st-century Canadian women
Medallists at the 2014 Commonwealth Games